The women's 3000 metres race of the 2015–16 ISU Speed Skating World Cup 5, arranged in the Sørmarka Arena in Stavanger, Norway, was held on 31 January 2016.

Martina Sáblíková of the Czech Republic won the race, while Ireen Wüst and Irene Schouten, both of the Netherlands, came second came second and third. Linda de Vries of the Netherlands won the Division B race.

Results
The race took place on Sunday, 31 January, with Division B scheduled in the morning session, at 12:35, and Division A scheduled in the afternoon session, at 16:35.

Division A

Division B

References

Women 3000
5